Olgite is a rare blue-green colored phosphate mineral series that forms microscopic prismatic crystals that are trigonal in structure.

Olgite was discredited as a mineral name in 2008 by the International Mineralogical Association and is now the series name for bario-olgite and strontio-olgite (hypothetical mineral). The substance was named after Russian mineralogist Olga Anisimovne-Vorobiova (1902–1974).

References

Phosphate minerals
Trigonal minerals
Minerals in space group 164